Hypoestes forskaolii is an annual or perennial herb that grows up to  tall with its stem and leaves being nearly glabrous. It has pale pink or white flowers.

Habitat
Hypoestes forskaolii is widely distributed throughout Oman, Yemen, Saudi Arabia and Tropical Africa. It grows under bushes and trees. Hypoestes forskaoleii appears during rains or can be seen the year round near water.

Effects
Hypoestes forskaolii is extremely toxic to all livestock.  It can be easily eaten in error by animals as they browse underneath trees or around water. When eaten it produces symptoms of violent shivering, head-shaking and fever.  It can be fatal in smaller or less healthy livestock.

Uses
Hypoestes forskaolii has recently been found of interest for containing new sources of antibiotic compounds.

History
Forsskaolii commemorates the Swedish botanist Pietr Forsskal.  He was the botanist on the ill-fated Danish expedition to Arabia Felix (present day North Yemen) of 1761-1763.  The aims of the expedition were wide-ranging and from a botanical point of view the trip was a great success and many Arabian plants were described for the first time.

References

forskaoleii